The West End Tournament was a golf tournament held in Australia from 1962 to 1974. The events were held at Victor Harbor Golf Club, Victor Harbor, South Australia. Kel Nagle won the event five times between 1966 and 1974. The event was sponsored by the South Australian Brewing Company, brewers of West End Draught. Total prize money was A£500 in 1962, A£1,000 in 1963 and 1964, A£1,500 in 1965, A$3,000 in 1966 and 1967, A$4,000 from 1968 to 1970, A$5,000 in 1971 and 1972 and A$7,000 in 1973 and 1974.

Winners

The 1962 event was played over 36 holes.

References

Golf tournaments in Australia
Golf in South Australia
Recurring sporting events established in 1962
Recurring events disestablished in 1974